Iyo may refer to: 
In Your Opinion (IYO) – Internet slang
Iyo language, New Guinea
Iyo, Benin
Iyo, Ehime, Japan
Iyo, legendary Japanese queen, also called Taiyoo
the former Iyo Province of Japan
the whole Shikoku island of Japan (archaic)
a character from Ani-Yoko